Merhaba Hayat is a Turkish series broadcast on Fox. It is a licensed adaptation of Private Practice and jointly produced by Med Productions.

Cast

Broadcast schedule

Turkish drama television series
Turkish medical television series
2012 Turkish television series debuts
2013 Turkish television series endings
Television series by Med Yapım
Fox (Turkish TV channel) original programming
Turkish television series based on American television series